R15, R-15, or similar, may refer to:

Automobiles 
 Audi R15 TDI, a Le Mans prototype racing car
 Renault 15, a French car
 Yamaha YZF-R15, a motorcycle sold in India and Colombia

Aviation 
 Rubik R-15 Koma, a Hungarian training glider
 Romano R.15, a French amphibious aircraft
 Tumansky R-15, a turbojet engine

Roads 
 Jalan Wang Kelian, in Malaysia
 R-15 regional road (Montenegro)

Vessels 
 , a destroyer of the Royal Navy
 , an aircraft carrier of the Royal Navy
 , a submarine of the United States Navy

Other uses 
 R-15 (novel series), a 2009 Japanese novel series by Hiroyuki Fushimi and Takuya Fujima
 R-15 (concert), a 2001 music concert by Filipina singer Regine Velasquez
 R-15 (missile), a Soviet submarine-launched ballistic missile
 R15 (Rodalies de Catalunya), a regional rail line in Catalonia, Spain
 R15 (New York City Subway car), a subway car built in 1950
 Emblem of the East, an Egyptian hieroglyph
 Oppo R15 Pro, a smartphone
 R15: Contact with water liberates extremely flammable gases, a risk phrase
 Ring chromosome 15